Skellig is a children's novel by the British author David Almond, published by Hodder in 1998. It was the Whitbread Children's Book of the Year and it won the Carnegie Medal from the Library Association, recognising the year's outstanding children's book by a British author. In the US it was a runner up for the Michael L. Printz Award, which recognises one work of young adult fiction annually. Since publication, it has also been adapted into a play, an opera, and a film. In 2010, a prequel entitled My Name is Mina was published, written by David Almond himself.

Delacorte Press published the first US edition in 1999.

Plot
10-year-old Michael and his family have recently moved into a house. He and his parents are nervous, as his new baby sister was born earlier than expected and may not live because of a heart condition. When Michael goes into the garage, he finds a strange emaciated creature hidden amid all the boxes, debris and dead insects. Michael assumes that he is a homeless person, but decides to look after him and gives him food. The man is crotchety and arthritic, demanding aspirin, Chinese food menu order numbers 27 and 53 and brown ale. Michael hears a story that human shoulder blades are a vestige of angel wings.

Meanwhile, his friends from school become more and more distant as Michael stops attending school and spends less time with them. He meets a girl named Mina from across the road and over the course of the story they become close. Mina is home-schooled and enjoys nature, birds, drawing and the poems of William Blake. Often drawing or sculpting at home, she invites Michael to join in. She takes care of some baby birds who live in her garden and teaches Michael to hear their tiny sounds. Michael decides to introduce her to the strange creature. Michael's friends, Leakey and Coot, become skeptical about Michael and try to find out what he is hiding from them. Michael and Mina try to keep it a secret from them, and have to move "Skellig" to a safer space.

Michael asks about arthritis and how to cure it, talking to doctors and patients in the hospital where his baby sister is being treated. Grace, an old woman, took a run through the hospital and came to see her. The creature whom Michael had moved from the garage—revealing a pair of wings at his shoulders—introduces himself as "Skellig" to Michael and Mina.

Michael's baby sister comes dangerously close to death, necessitating heart surgery. His mother goes to the hospital to stay with the baby and, that night, "dreams" of seeing Skellig come in, pick the baby up, and hold it high in the air, saving her. He subsequently moves from the garage after saying goodbye to Michael and Mina, answering their questions about his nature by saying that he is 'something,' combining aspects of human, owl and angel.

The family struggles with deciding on a name for the baby. After considering calling her Persephone, they settle on Joy.

Characters
 Michael (Main Character)
 Mina (Michael's friend)

 Leakey (Michael's friend)
 Coot (Michael's friend)
 Skellig (Main character) 
 Joy (Michael's baby sister)
 Whisper (Mina's cat)
Mr. Stone (Real estate agent that sells Michael's family the house)
Dr. Death (a.k.a. Dr. Dan, the doctor that comes to Michael's house to check up on the baby)
Rasputin (Michael's science teacher)
Grace (Old woman from hospital)
Dr. MacNabola (A cocky but friendly Dr who Michael talks to in order to figure more about arthritis)
Mr. Batley (a Builder)
Gus (a Builder and Mr. Batley's son)
Nick (a Builder and Mr. Batley's son)
Lucy (a student at Michael's school)
Mrs. Dando (A yard lady at Michael's school)
Miss Clarts (Michael's English teacher)
Mrs Moore (The school secretary of Michael's school)
"The Yeti" (The corridor keeper)
"Monkey Mitford" (Michael's math teacher)
Ernie Myers (Former owner of the house)
"Mum" (Michael's mother)
"Dad" (Michael's father)
Mrs. McKee (Mina's mother)
"Old guy on the bus" (A person who talks to Michael about evolution and monkeys in a circus)

Themes

Skellig is deliberately ambiguous about its title character. Almond has provided public answers to some frequent questions from his school visits. The names "Skellig" and "Michael" are derived from the Skellig Islands off the coast of County Kerry, Ireland. One of them is Skellig Michael Island; St Michael is also the name of an archangel. 

Almond has acknowledged the influence of "A Very Old Man with Enormous Wings", a short story by Gabriel García Márquez. Paul Latham compares the works in a research article, "Magical Realism and the Child Reader: The Case of David Almond's Skellig". Despite many similarities, he notes that Almond's child protagonists are much more caring and accepting than the closed-minded and sometimes cruel adults in the Márquez story. Also, Mina and Michael keep Skellig a secret from the rest of human society. Thus the negative social commentary in Skellig, regarding medical institutions and other aspects of adult society, is not as harsh as in Márquez's story.Prequel

Hodder published Almond's 300-page prequel to Skellig late in 2010, My Name is Mina. It was one of four books on the 2011 Guardian Award shortlist and one of eight on the 2012 Carnegie shortlist. Both The Guardian and the Carnegie panel recommend Mina for readers age nine and up. According to children's book editor Julia Eccleshare, "Almond promotes and celebrates freedom for children and their thinking in this lyrical book about growing up."

Delacorte published the US edition in 2011. According to the summary, "Creative, intelligent, nine-year-old Mina keeps a journal in her own disorderly way that reveals how her mind is growing into something extraordinary, especially after she begins homeschooling under the direction of her widowed mother.""Formats and Editions of My name is Mina". WorldCat. Retrieved 14 October 2012.

Adaptations

2003 playSkellig was adapted into a play in 2003 directed by Trevor Nunn who thought it was important to follow the book's example of not revealing Skellig's exact nature, designed by John Napier. The original play was conceived from the novel to the play at The Young Vic Theatre, London. Cast included in alphabetical order; Ashley Artus, Noma Dumezweni, Akiya Henry, David Threlfall, Kevin Wathen, Mo Zinal. The play was later performed by Playbox Theatre Company in 2008.
In March 2011 the play was performed at the New Victory Theater, New York by The Birmingham Stage Company who previously toured the UK with their production, from 2008 in London and Birmingham. The BSC founder and manager Neal Foster played Skellig."Skellig" (reviews). The Birmingham Stage Company. Review dates 2008 to 2011(?).

2008 operaSkellig has been adapted into a contemporary opera with music by American composer Tod Machover and libretto by David Almond himself. The opera was staged at The Sage Gateshead from 4 November to 19 December 2008, with orchestration by the Northern Sinfonia.
The Opera starred Omar Ebrahim as Skellig with Sophie Daneman and Paul Keohone as Michael's parents.

2009 filmSkellig, produced by Feel Films, was part of Sky 1's plan to invest £10 million in producing three new high-definition dramas. Filming started on 2 September 2008 in Caerphilly in Wales. Cast members included Oscar-nominee Tim Roth in the title role and Bill Milner as Michael Cooper with Skye Bennett as Mina, Kelly Macdonald and John Simm as Michael's parents (Louise 'Lou' and Steve Cooper). The screenplay was written by Irena Brignull and filming was directed by Annabel Jankel. The first showing of Skellig on Sky 1 was on 12 April 2009.

See also
 

References

External links
  —immediately, first US edition 
 Skellig on Sky1, Easter 2009: cast interviews and behind the scenes exclusives

 "Risk and Resilience, Knowledge and Imagination: The Enlightenment of David Almond's Skellig", Elizabeth Bullen and Elizabeth Parsons, Children's Literature'' 35 (2007) 127–44
 Reviews and discussions of the ideas in Skellig 
 Skellig at Common Sense Media
 Skellig pdf

1998 British novels
1998 children's books
British children's novels
British magic realism novels
Carnegie Medal in Literature winning works
Novels set in Newcastle upon Tyne
British novels adapted into films
British novels adapted into plays
Novels adapted into operas
Hodder & Stoughton books